Taiwan train crash may refer to:

 1991 Miaoli train collision
 2018 Yilan train derailment
 2021 Hualien train derailment